Chakhar Chamani (also Romanized as Chākhar Chamanī and Chākher Chamanī; also known as Chahār Chaman) is a village in Arshaq-e Gharbi Rural District, Moradlu District, Meshgin Shahr County, Ardabil Province, Iran. At the 2006 census, its population was 192, in 48 families.

References 

Towns and villages in Meshgin Shahr County